The 32nd General Assembly of Nova Scotia represented Nova Scotia between 1897 and 1901.

The Liberal Party led by George Henry Murray formed the government.

Frederick A. Lawrence was chosen as speaker for the house.

The assembly was dissolved on September 3, 1901.

List of Members 

Notes:

References 
 

Terms of the General Assembly of Nova Scotia
1897 establishments in Nova Scotia
1901 disestablishments in Nova Scotia
19th century in Nova Scotia
20th century in Nova Scotia